Thunder Glacier may refer to:

Thunder Glacier (Antarctica)
Thunder Glacier (Mount Baker), on Mount Baker, Washington, USA
Thunder Glacier (Skagit County, Washington), in North Cascades National Park, Washington, USA
Thunder Glacier (New Zealand)